West Ham United finished in seventh place in the Second Division in the 1979–80 season.

Season summary
West Ham United's season was dominated by their 1–0 victory in the FA Cup final against Arsenal, who had been in the previous two FA Cup Finals, had just finished 4th in the First Division and were the overwhelming favourites.

West Ham's manager John Lyall tactically outsmarted his Arsenal counterpart Terry Neill by paying a 4–5–1 system, stifling Arsenal's creative midfield that included future West Ham signing Liam Brady and the steely Brian Talbot. The only goal was scored by Trevor Brooking.

League table

Results

Football League Second Division

FA Cup

League Cup

Squad

1979-80
English football clubs 1979–80 season
1979 sports events in London
1980 sports events in London